The spangled kookaburra (Dacelo tyro) also called Aru giant kingfisher, is a little-known species of kookaburra found in the Aru Islands, Trans-Fly savanna and grasslands of southern New Guinea. Practically nothing is known of its family life or breeding biology.

Taxonomy 
Two subspecies are recognised:

 D. t. tyro – Aru Islands, Indonesia
 D. t. archboldi – New Guinea

Description 
It has bright blue wings and tail, a white chest and belly, dark eyes, and a striking white-spotted black head. The upper mandible is dark grey whilst the lower mandible is white. Males and females look alike.

References

External links 

 BirdLife Species Factsheet

spangled kookaburra
Birds of the Aru Islands
Birds of New Guinea
spangled kookaburra
spangled kookaburra